Marlon Gaillard (born 9 May 1996 in Chinon) is a French cyclist, who currently rides for UCI ProTeam .

Major results
2016
 8th Overall Tour de Gironde
2018
 4th Overall Ronde de l'Isard
 4th Overall Tour du Maroc
1st  Young rider classification
 6th Paris–Mantes-en-Yvelines
 8th Flèche Ardennaise
2019
 2nd Overall Ronde de l'Oise
1st Stage 1

References

External links

1996 births
Living people
French male cyclists
People from Chinon
Sportspeople from Indre-et-Loire
Cyclists from Centre-Val de Loire